Matthias Eklund (born July 23, 1976) is a retired Swedish football striker. 

He played most of his career in Landskrona BoIS.
He played for Landskrona between 1997 and 2008 – one season in the third tier, seven seasons in the second tier and four seasons in the highest division Allsvenskan.

He also played for Helsingborgs IF and Lönsboda GoIF.

External links 
 Matthias Eklund - Landskrona BoIS - Player stats
 

1976 births
Living people
Swedish footballers
Association football forwards
Landskrona BoIS players